The 1956–57 Illinois Fighting Illini men’s basketball team represented the University of Illiniois.

Regular season
Harry Combes celebrated 10 years as the head coach of the University of Illinois' Fighting Illini basketball team.  During his ten years as coach, Combes had established the Illini as a national powerhouse with sportswriters taking note. For example, the Associated Press began its
basketball poll in 1949 with United Press International adding its poll in
1951 and from 1951-56 the Illini finished the season ranked in the Top 20 nationally every year. Illinois’ highest final ranking in the 1950s was second in both polls in 1952.

The 1956-57 team, unfortunately, would begin a downward spiral for Combes success, sending it into a time span where his teams would finish in the lower half of the Big Ten for four of six years.  A highlight of the 1957 season would take place on December 17, 1956, when Illinois defeated San Francisco, 62-33, snapping the Dons’ 51-game regular-season win streak. This season also marked the first time that a Fighting Illini team entered a holiday tournament. The Kentucky Invitational brought Southern Methodist, Dayton and Illinois to Lexington for a two-day tournament, once again matching Adolph Rupp with Combes.  Combes had talented lettermen return including the leading scorers George Bon Salle, Don Ohl and team "captain" Harv Schmidt. It also saw the return of Bill Altenberger, Hiles Stout, John Paul and Ted Caiazza. The team also added sophomore Roger Taylor. The Illini finished the season with a conference record of 7 wins and 7 losses, finishing in 7th place in the Big Ten. They would finish with an overall record of 14 wins and 8 losses.  The starting lineup included George Bon Salle at the center position, Roger Taylor and Don Ohl at guard and Harv Schmidt and Hiles Stout at the forward slots.

Roster

Source

Schedule
												
Source																
												

|-
!colspan=12 style="background:#DF4E38; color:white;"| Non-Conference regular season

|-
!colspan=9 style="background:#DF4E38; color:#FFFFFF;"|Big Ten regular season

|-					

Bold Italic connotes conference game

Player stats

Awards and honors
George Bon Salle
National Association of Basketball Coaches 2nd Team All-American
Converse Honorable Mention All-American
Don Ohl
Converse Honorable Mention All-American
Associated Press Mention All-American
Harv Schmidt
Converse 2nd Team All-American
Team Most Valuable Player

Team players drafted into the NBA

Rankings

References

Illinois Fighting Illini
Illinois Fighting Illini men's basketball seasons
1956 in sports in Illinois
1957 in sports in Illinois